The 2012–13 Botola is the 56th season of the Moroccan Top League, but the 2nd under its new format of Moroccan Pro League. It began on 14 September 2012 with KAC Kénitra beating COD Meknès 2–1 in their away match and ended on 2 June 2013 when Wydad Fes beating Raja Beni Mellal 4-1 in their away match. Moghreb Tétouan are the defending champion but they finished in 6th place in this season. The winner of this season will qualify to the 2013 FIFA Club World Cup as host representatives.

Overview

Team summaries

Promotion and relegation
Teams promoted from 2011–12 GNF 2
 Raja Beni Mellal
 Renaissance Sportive Berkane

Teams relegated to 2012–13 GNF 2
 Jeunesse Sportive El Massira
 Ittihad Khemisset

Stadiums and locations

Source: Soccerway.com

League table

Leader week after week

Season statistics

Top goalscorers
.

References

External links

 Season at soccerway.com
 Botola Pro

Botola seasons
Morocco
1